Joshua Rowntree  (6 April 1844 – 10 February 1915) was elected Member of Parliament (MP) for Scarborough in 1886 and served, as a Gladstonian Liberal, until 1892, when he was succeeded by the Conservative, Sir George Reresby Sitwell, whom he had defeated in 1886.

Early life

He was educated at Bootham School, York.

Quakers

He was an active Quaker. After he left Parliament, in 1892, he 'gave himself with whole heart and mind to the modern interpretation of Quakerism'. He took a quiet part in enabling British Friends to come to terms with scientific discoveries and biblical criticism and with shaking off outdated customs—notably through the Manchester conference (1895), Scarborough summer school (1897), and the establishment in 1903 of a study centre at Woodbrooke, Birmingham. He was editor of The Friend from 1872 to 1875.

He gave the Swarthmore Lecture in 1913 under the title Social Service – Its Place in the Society of Friends.

Joshua Rowntree's publications
Opium habit in the East: A study of the evidence given to the Royal Commission on Opium, 1893–94. P. S. King & Son: Westminster, 1895.
Applied Christianity and War. An address. [c. 1904.]
The Imperial Drug Trade. Methuen, First edition, 1905, Second edition, 1906
Social Service, its place in the Society of Friends. (Series: Swarthmore Lectures) Headley Bros.: London, 1913.

References

Sources

Notes

External links 
 
The Rowntree Society

1844 births
1915 deaths
People educated at Bootham School
Liberal Party (UK) MPs for English constituencies
English Quakers
UK MPs 1886–1892
Politicians from Scarborough, North Yorkshire